Judge McCormick may refer to:

Andrew Phelps McCormick (1832–1916), judge of the United States Court of Appeals for the Fifth Circuit
John E. McCormick (1924–2010), judge of the Wisconsin Circuit Court 
Kathaleen McCormick (born 1979/80), judge of the Delaware Court of Chancery
Mark McCormick (judge) (born 1933), justice of the Iowa Supreme Court
Paul John McCormick (1879–1960), judge of the United States District Court for the Southern District of California